Cyperus ferax is a species of sedge that is endemic to an area of the Americas.

The species was first formally described by the botanist Louis Claude Richard in 1792.

See also
 List of Cyperus species

References

ferax
Plants described in 1792
Taxa named by Louis Claude Richard
Flora of Mexico
Flora of Brazil
Flora of Venezuela
Flora of Suriname
Flora of Jamaica
Flora of Haiti
Flora of Guyana
Flora of Cuba
Flora of Colombia
Flora of the Dominican Republic
Flora without expected TNC conservation status